Mesalina pasteuri, also known commonly as Pasteur's lizard, is a species of sand-dwelling lizard in the family Lacertidae. The species is endemic to North Africa.

Etymology
The specific name, pasteuri, is in honor of French biologist Georges Pasteur.

Geographic range
M. pasteuri occurs in Algeria, Egypt, Mali, Mauritania, Morocco, Niger, and Western Sahara.

Habitat
The preferred habitat of M. pasteuri is desert.

Description

Reproduction
M. pasteuri is oviparous.

References

Further reading
Bons, Jacques (1960). "Description d'un nouveau lézard du Sahara: Eremias pasteuri, sp. nov. (Lacertidés) ". Comptes rendus des séances mensuelles de la Société des Sciences naturelles et physiques du Maroc (4): 69–71. (Eremias pasteuri, new species). (in French).
Schleich, H. Hermann; Kästle, Werner; Kabisch, Klaus (1996). Amphibians and Reptiles of North Africa: Biology, Systematics, Field Guide. Koenigstein, Germany: Koeltz Scientific Books. 627 pp. . (Mesalina pasteuri, p. 423).
Sindaco, Roberto; Jeremčenko Valery K. (2008). The Reptiles of the Western Palearctic: 1. Annotated Checklist and Distributional Atlas of the Turtles, Crocodiles, Amphisbaenians and Lizards of Europe, North Africa, Middle East and Central Asia. Latina, Italy: Edizioni Belvedere. 580 pp. .
Trape, Jean-François; Trape, Sébastien; Chirio, Laurent (2012). Lézards, crocodiles et tortues d'Afrique occidentale et du Sahara. Paris: IRD Orstom. 503 pp. . (in French).

pasteuri
Reptiles described in 1960
Taxa named by Jacques Bons